The Gryphon's Skull is a historical fiction novel written by H.N. Turteltaub (a pseudonym of Harry Turtledove). It was first published in hardcover by Tor Books in December 2002, and in paperback by the same publisher in December 2003. The book was reissued under the author's real name as an ebook by Phoenix Pick in March 2014, and as a trade paperback by the same publisher in April of the same year. It is the second book in the Hellenic Traders series.

Plot summary
The book follows the adventures of Menedemos and his cousin, Sostratos, seafaring traders from Rhodes in the eastern Mediterranean in the years after Alexander the Great. The plot centers around the discovery of an apparent gryphon skull (in reality a skull from a dinosaur), and the efforts of Sostratos to get the skull back to scholars for study.

Reception
The book was reviewed by K. V. Bailey in Vector 227, January 2003, and Peter Heck (2003) in Asimov's Science Fiction, May 2003.

References

2002 American novels
Hellenic Traders novels
Novels set in ancient Greece
Tor Books books
Novels set in the 4th century BC